Wilfred Merritt (1864 – after 1890) was an English footballer who played in the Football League and the Football Alliance for Stoke.

Career
Merritt started his career at his home town club Leek. He joined Stoke in January 1889, during his time at Stoke he was mainly used as a back-up to first choice goalkeeper Bill Rowley. Merritt made just five appearances in his ten months at Stoke before returning to Leek.

Career statistics

Honours
with Stoke
 Football Alliance champions: 1890–91

References

1864 births
Year of death missing
Sportspeople from Leek, Staffordshire
Footballers from Staffordshire
Association football goalkeepers
Leek F.C. players
Stoke City F.C. players
English Football League players
Football Alliance players